The 1973 Canadian Grand Prix was a Formula One motor race held at Mosport Park on 23 September 1973. It was race 14 of 15 in both the 1973 World Championship of Drivers and the 1973 International Cup for Formula One Manufacturers.

The 80-lap race was won by Peter Revson, driving a McLaren M23, after starting from second on the grid. This turned out to be Revson's last victory and podium finish in Formula One. , this is the last Grand Prix to be won by a driver born in the USA. Emerson Fittipaldi took second position for Team Lotus, while Jackie Oliver took third in a Shadow, his first podium in five years and his last of all. 

This was also the 99th and last race start of triple world champion Jackie Stewart.

Qualifying classification

Race report 
This was the first Grand Prix to feature a car with the number 0, the car in question being the McLaren of Jody Scheckter.

The race began in very wet conditions, which caused a number of incidents later in the race. François Cevert and Scheckter collided on the 32nd lap, resulting in the deployment of a safety car for the first time in Formula One history (although it would not be until twenty years later, in 1993, when these cars were given an official role). The car in question was a yellow Porsche 914 driven by former F1 privateer Eppie Wietzes. Wietzes stayed in front of Howden Ganley's Iso-Marlboro by mistake, which allowed several drivers, including eventual winner Peter Revson, to gain a lap on the field.

Pit stops at the time were unusual. Formula One had only recently switched to slick tyres but the drying conditions necessitated stops mid-race. The small pit lane at Mosport became busy, with a number of drivers heading into the pit lane only to have to drive through as there was no room for them to be serviced.
Ganley realised the problem and waited until team-mate Tim Schenken had made his stop, making him one of the last to stop.
The pit stops caused significant confusion, with some believing the leader to be Ganley and others, including Team Lotus manager Colin Chapman, believing it to be Emerson Fittipaldi. Chapman even went as far as to perform his traditional victory celebration of tossing his cap in the air at the end of what he believed to be the 80th lap, even though Fittipaldi was not shown the checkered flag. After a long pause, the starter waved the flag over a group of cars consisting of Ganley, Mike Hailwood, Peter Revson and James Hunt. Despite seeing the flag first, Ganley did not believe he had won the race, despite lap charts kept by the team showing him leading. The officials then announced Revson as the winner after a long confusion which included protests from Ganley's then girlfriend (later wife) who had been keeping the team's lap chart.
Ganley maintains he feels he won the race, citing the fact official lap charts have him pitting when he did not.

Race classification

Championship standings after the race

Drivers' Championship standings

Constructors' Championship standings

References

Canadian Grand Prix
Canadian Grand Prix
1973 in Canadian motorsport
Grand Prix